Shihan Hussaini is an Indian karate expert, who has also worked as an actor in Tamil language films. His brother Ishaq Hussaini has also appeared in Tamil films. He has also been widely covered in Indian media for his acts of devotion towards politician Jayalalitha and for his world record attempts.

Career

Acting career
Shihan Hussaini rose to fame by his achievements as a karate instructor and set up a school to help young martial arts fighters. Hussaini made his acting debut through K. Balachander's romantic drama Punnagai Mannan, where he played a dancer who treats Revathi's character harshly as a result of her Sri Lankan heritage. The success of the film prompted filmmakers to sign him on to play the antagonist in Rajinikanth's Velaikaran (1987) and in R. K. Selvamani's shelved Moongil Kottai, which featured him alongside Vijayakanth. During the period in the late 1980s and early 1990s, he also worked on the Hollywood production Bloodstone (1988), the Karthik-starrer Unnai Solli Kutramillai (1990) and the Sarathkumar-starrer Vedan (1993). Other films he worked on included Naadodigal featuring Khushbu and Ravichandran's Santharpangal, though neither film released.

Furthermore, he appeared in a film titled My India where he played the lead role alongside actresses Swathi and Vani Viswanath. His most recent on-screen appearance was in Badri, where he played Vijay's fitness coach and helped contribute to the making of the "Travelling Soldier" song. In March 2014, he revealed that he was working on the pre-production of a film titled Mudivu, while denying rumours that he was approached to act in Gautham Vasudev Menon's Yennai Arindhaal (2015).

Other
In 1998, he helped coordinate security for actor Kamal Haasan during the making of Marudhanayagam, and during the premiere shows of Shankar's Jeans (1998). As a devoted follower of politician Jayalalitha, Shihan Hussaini painted 56 portraits of her using his blood to mark her 56th birthday in 2005. In February 2013, Hussaini unveiled a bust of Jayalalitha's face using frozen blood. Hussaini claimed he had collected 11 litres of blood, and that his own was added to blood donated by his archery disciples, including women. Unruffled by critics who accused him of sycophancy, he maintained that his admiration for the politician was normal. In February 2015, Hussaini crucified himself wearing a T-shirt with ‘Amma’ on it, praying that Jayalalitha won her upcoming elections. He remained hanging for more than six minutes after his associates pounded six-inch nails into his hands and feet. After the four nails were slowly pulled out, Hussaini was put in a waiting ambulance and taken to the ICU of a nearby hospital. His actions were widely described by commentators as "foolish".

In 2016, Shihan Hussaini was working as an archery coach and as the founder and general secretary of the Archery Association of Tamil Nadu, the only state archery body recognised and affiliated with the Tamil Nadu Olympic Association and the Archery Association of India.

Hussaini is currently working as a chef and hosts a TV show in Mega TV, called Athiradi Samayal.

Filmography

Television

References

1964 births
Living people
Indian chefs
Male actors in Tamil cinema
Indian male film actors
Male actors from Tamil Nadu
Indian male martial artists